The Southern Adirondack System (SALS) is a consortium of thirty-four libraries in Saratoga, Warren, Washington, and Hamilton counties in New York.

SALS is one of 23 public state-supported library systems in New York.  It was chartered in 1959 by the New York State Board of Regents.  It provides a consolidated online catalog and interlibrary loan services for its member libraries.

Member libraries

Saratoga County
 Ballston Spa Public Library
 Burnt Hills--Town of Ballston Community Library
 Corinth Free Library
 Clifton Park-Halfmoon Public Library
 Galway Public Library
 Round Lake Library/Malta Branch
 Mechanicville District Public Library
 Hadley-Luzerne Public Library
 Round Lake Library
 Saratoga Springs Public Library
 Stillwater Free Library
 Schuylerville Public Library
 Waterford Public Library

Warren County
 Bolton Free Library
 Brant Lake - Horicon Free Public Library
 Caldwell-Lake George Library
 Town of Chester Public Library
 Glens Falls - Crandall Public Library
 Town of Johnsburg Library
 Stony Creek Free Library
 Warrensburg - Richards Library

Washington County
 Argyle Free Library
 Cambridge Public Library
 Easton Library
 Fort Edward Free Library
 Granville - Pember Library and Museum
 Greenwich Free Library
 Hudson Falls Free Library
 Salem - Bancroft Public Library
 Whitehall Free Library

Hamilton County
 Town of Inlet Public Library
 Town of Indian Lake Public Library
 Long Lake—Cornelius Vanderbilt Whitney Long Lake Public Library
 Town of Lake Pleasant Public Library
 Raquette Lake Free Library

External links
 

Public libraries in New York (state)